Season one of the 2017 edition of El Gran Show premiered on April 1, 2017.

This season also featured a new segment called "Bailando por El Show", in which every week two new couples faced each other to get a pass to the original competition. The VIP Jury, which was formed by a member of the artistic medium, is no longer incorporated this season. On April 15, a special presentation was made for the 10 years of the show, so the third week was filed on the following date.

On June 3, 2017, Diana Sánchez and Maylor Pérez were declared the winners, Christian Domínguez and Isabel Acevedo finished second, while Andrea Luna and Marlon Pérez finished third.

Cast

Couples
Celebrities and professional dancers were announced during the first week of the program. Christian Dominguez and Isabel Acevedo returned after being disqualified last season.  In addition to Acevedo, Yamila Molina, George Neyra and Mariale Pineda returned to the program as professional dancers, the rest of the dancers are new to the track.

Hosts and judges
Gisela Valcárcel returned as host while Morella Petrozzi, Carlos Cacho, Michelle Alexander and Pachi Valle Riestra returned as judges. The VIP Judge was not incorporated this season. On May 27, Alfredo Di Natale (ex-judge, professional dancer and director of the Arthur Murray dance school) joined the panel as a guest judge, replacing Michelle Alexander who did not appear for personal reasons. In the final, there were ten VIP judges, who along with the main judges determined the winning couple.

Scoring charts

Red numbers indicate the sentenced for each week
Green numbers indicate the best steps for each week
"—" indicates the couple(s) did not dance that week 
 the couple was eliminated that week
 the couple was safe in the duel
  the couple was eliminated that week and safe with a lifeguard
 the winning couple
 the runner-up couple
 the third-place couple

Average score chart
This table only counts dances scored on a 40-point scale.

Highest and lowest scoring performances
The best and worst performances in each dance according to the judges' 40-point scale are as follows:

Couples' highest and lowest scoring dances
Scores are based upon a potential 40-point maximum.

Weekly scores
Individual judges' scores in the charts below (given in parentheses) are listed in this order from left to right: Morella Petrozzi, Carlos Cacho, Michelle Alexander, Pachi Valle Riestra.

Week 1: First Dances
The couples danced cumbia, reggaeton o salsa. Due to personal issues, not all couples danced and none were sentenced.
Running order

Week 2: Party Night
The couples danced one unlearned dance.
Running order

Week 3: Salsa Night 
The couples (except those sentenced) danced salsa and the danceathon. In the little train, only the men faced dancing strip dance.
Running order

The duel*
George & Mía: Eliminated
Carloncho & Alexa: Safe

Week 4: Team Night 
The couples were divided into two teams led by Christian & Isabel and Yaco & Mariale, both faced each other by performing the team dances, the versus and the little-train. The team with the highest score, Christian Group, won the best steps while the Team Yaco passed sentence. The sentenced couples performed their dances, although they were not considered in the final performance.

Due to personal issues, Viviana Rivasplata and Franco Bragagnini were not present at the gala, so the winning couple of the season 1 of 2016, Milett Figueroa and Patricio Quiñones, they replaced.

Week 5: Cumbia Night 
The couples (except those sentenced) danced cumbia. In the versus, only three couples faced dancing strip dance, the winner would take two extra points plus the couples who gave their support votes

Viviana Rivasplata returned after being absent the past week, this time with the dancer André Lecca who replaced Franco Bragagnini.
Running order

The duel*
Yaco & Mariale: Safe
Diana & Maylor: Safe
Shirley & George: Eliminated (but safe with the lifeguard)

Week 6: Characterization Night 
The couples performed one unlearned dance being characterized to popular music icons.

Due to personal issues, Mariale Pineda could no longer dance with Yaco Eskenazi, so the troupe member Julianna Villacorta replaced her.
Running order

The duel*
Yaco & Julianna: Safe
Carloncho & Alexa: Eliminated

Week 7: Bachata Night 
The couples (except those sentenced) danced bachata and a team dance, in which only celebrities participated.
Running order

The duel*
Viviana & André: Eliminated (but safe with the lifeguard)
Shirley & George: Eliminated 
Yaco & Julianna: Safe

Week 8: Semifinals 
Individual judges' scores in the charts below (given in parentheses) are listed in this order from left to right: Morella Petrozzi, Carlos Cacho, Alfredo Di Natale, Pachi Valle Riestra.

The couples performed a dance improvisation which involved seven different dance styles, all being rehearsed during the week by the couples and only one being chosen by a draw in the live show and a trio cha-cha-cha involving another celebrity (except those sentenced).

Running order

The duel*
Viviana & Jimmy: Eliminated
Yaco & Julianna: Safe

Week 9: Final 
On the first part, the couples danced freestyle.

On the second part, the four finalist couples performed peruvian dances.

On the third part, the three finalist couples danced a viennese waltz.
Running order (Part 1)

Running order (Part 2)

Running order (Part 3)

Dance chart
The celebrities and professional partners will dance one of these routines for each corresponding week:
 Week 1: Cumbia, reggaeton or salsa (First Dances)
 Week 2: One unlearned dance (Party Night)
 Week 3: Salsa & the danceathon (Salsa Night)
 Week 4: Team dances, the versus & the little train (Team Night)
 Week 5: Cumbia & the versus (Cumbia Night)
 Week 6: One unlearned dance (Characterization Night)
 Week 7: Bachata & the little train (Bachata Night)
 Week 8: Dance improvisation & trio cha-cha-cha (Semifinal)
 Week 9: freestyle, peruvian dances & viennese waltz (Final)

 "—" indicates the couple(s) did not dance that week 
 Highest scoring dance
 Lowest scoring dance
 Gained bonus points for winning
 Gained no bonus points for losing
 Danced, but not scored
In Italic indicate the dance in "The duel"

Guest judges

Notes

References

External links

El Gran Show
2017 Peruvian television seasons
Reality television articles with incorrect naming style